Lauingen (Swabian: Lauinga) is a town in the district of Dillingen in Bavaria, Germany. It is located on the left bank of the Danube, 5 km west of Dillingen, and 37 km northeast of Ulm.

In June 1800, the armies of the French First Republic, under command of Jean Victor Moreau, fought Habsburg regulars and Württemberg contingents, under the general command of Pál Kray.  Kray had taken refuge in the fortress at Ulm; Moreau diverted his army to approach Ulm from the east. Kray had ordered preparation for the destruction of all the bridges across the Danube, including the one at Lauingen.  A small group of French captured a foothold on the northern bank of the Danube by Grensheim, and Moreau's forces were able to move against the fortress on both sides of the river.  At this battle, the culmination of the Danube Campaign of 1800, Moreau forced Kray to abandon Ulm and withdraw into eastern Bavaria.

Notable people

 Albertus Magnus (around 1200-1280), Dominican, bishop and important Aristotelian scholar
 Martin Ruland the Younger (1569-1611), physician and alchemist
 Nikolaus Geiger (1849-1897), painter and sculptor
 Heinz Piontek (1925-2003), writer and Büchner Prize winner lived from 1947 to 1955 in Lauingen

International relations

Lauingen is twinned with:

  Marzahn-Hellersdorf, Berlin, Germany
  Segré, France
  Treviglio, Italy

References

See also
 Shoes on the Danube Bank

Dillingen (district)
Burial sites of the House of Palatinate-Zweibrücken
Populated places on the Danube